The 1923 San Francisco Seals season was the 21st season in the history of the San Francisco Seals baseball team. The 1923 team won the Pacific Coast League (PCL) pennant with a 124–77 record. 

Dots Miller began the season as the team's manager.  However, he developed tuberculosis and resigned his position in July to seek treatment at a sanitarium in Saranac Lake, New York. He died there in September 1923.

When Miller resigned as manager, first baseman Babe Ellison became a player-manager. He compiled a .358 batting average and led the team with 23 home runs, 67 doubles, and a .564 slugging percentage. 

Right fielder Paul Waner, playing his first season of professional baseball at age 20, led the 1923 Seals with a .369 batting average. Waner later played 15 years for the Pittsburgh Pirates and was inducted into the Baseball Hall of Fame in 1952.

Pitcher Harry Courtney led the PCL with a .766 winning percentage (19 wins, six losses) and ranked second in the league with a 2.80 earned run average (ERA). In addition, three other San Francisco pitchers (Red Shea, Bob Geary, and Doug McWeeny) won at least 20 games each.

Players

Batting 
Note: Pos = Position; G = Games played; AB = At bats; H = Hits; Avg. = Batting average; HR = Home runs; SLG = Slugging percentage

Pitching 
Note: G = Games pitched; IP = Innings pitched; W = Wins; L = Losses; PCT = Win percentage; ERA = Earned run average; SO = Strikeouts

References

1923 in sports in California
Pacific Coast League seasons